Shailendra Singh may refer to:

Shailendra Singh (police officer), former policeman, Right to Information Commissioner
Shailendra Singh (singer) (born 1952), Indian playback singer